Anthony John Randazzo (born January 11, 1965) is an American umpire in Major League Baseball. After working in the National League in 1999, he has umpired in both Major Leagues since 2000.

College baseball
He is a graduate of Lake Park High School, and was a junior college catcher at Iowa Western Community College before injuries ended his playing career. Randazzo left college and attended the Harry Wendelstedt Umpire School shortly thereafter.

Umpiring career
Randazzo has umpired in eight Division Series (2004, 2006, 2009, 2011, 2012, 2013, 2016, 2021), two League Championship Series (2010, 2015), and the 2016 World Series. He has also officiated in two All-Star Games (2001, 2012).

On July 30, 2012, Randazzo was hit in the hip after a line drive by Jesus Montero. Randazzo was not seriously injured and stayed in the game.

In the 2014 season, Randazzo was involved in an incident with Seattle Mariners manager Lloyd McClendon. On August 16, 2014, Randazzo ejected McClendon for arguing balls and strikes on behalf of starting pitcher Félix Hernández. The argument followed a moment in which Randazzo granted Detroit Tigers first baseman Miguel Cabrera a timeout late into Hernandez' windup, which had already caused McClendon to argue that Randazzo should not have granted a timeout to begin with. Following the game, the pitch McClendon had argued was a strike was clearly displayed as a strike according to PitchF/X. McClendon also said that Randazzo's reasoning for ejecting him was because, "well, I've seen your act before." In the following day's game in which Randazzo was the third base umpire, he again ejected McClendon for allegedly throwing his arms up after disagreeing with a check swing call. The ejection drew criticism from broadcasters of the Mariners, Tigers, and the national broadcast on TBS.

Personal life

Randazzo is married and has three children. Randazzo's father George is founder and chairman of the National Italian American Sports Hall of Fame. His brother Marc is a Florida restaurant owner and former World Boxing Council Continental Cruiserweight Champion. He is also the cousin of Wayne Randazzo, the television play-by-play announcer for the Los Angeles Angels.

See also 

 List of Major League Baseball umpires

References

External links
 MLB.com profile
 Retrosheet

1965 births
Living people
American people of Italian descent
Iowa Western Reivers baseball players
Major League Baseball umpires
Sportspeople from Chicago
Baseball people from Illinois